Willem Maris (born 14 September 1939 —  13 December 2010) was a Dutch businessman, engineer and tennis player.

Born in Utrecht, Maris was the Dutch national champion in 1958 and 1962. He played in the Davis Cup for the Netherlands from 1958 to 1963 and twice made the singles second round of the Wimbledon Championships.

Maris served as CEO of Dutch multinational ASML through the 1990s.

See also
List of Netherlands Davis Cup team representatives

References

External links
 
 
 

1939 births
2010 deaths
Dutch male tennis players
Dutch business executives
Businesspeople from Utrecht (city)
Sportspeople from Utrecht (city)
20th-century Dutch people